The USATF Masters Outdoor Championships is an annual track and field competition which serves as the national championship for the United States for athletes in masters age groups. Organized by USA Track & Field, the national governing body for the sport, the competition was first held in 1968. Athletes compete in 5-year age groups, beginning from 25 and up to 105 (where sufficient entries are made). Traditionally limited to athletes over 35, a "pre-masters" group was introduced in 2020 to encourage post-collegiate athletes over 25 to continue competing.

The 1968 meet was the first ever national championship for masters track and field. David Pain organized a masters mile run competition in 1966 at Balboa Stadium in San Diego, which grew into a wider track and field championship two years later.

History

Through the efforts of David Pain, masters track and field and its first Outdoor Track and Field Championship began in 1968. The first competition was held July 19–21, 1968 in San Diego. The 1968 meet included competitions for men age 40 and older. The meet has continued annually since, with the exception of 2020 which was cancelled due to the COVID-19 pandemic. The 1968 meet, and for several years after, included programs providing time schedules, and athletes names and ages. 1968 represented the first time a major masters track and field competition was held. The meet was sponsored by the San Diego Recreation Department, San Diego Track and Field Association, and the Los Angeles Seniors Track Club.

The 1971 meet (and future meets) added women as part of the competition. The 2019 meet included a complete set of individual running (sprints, middle distance, and long distance), hurdles, steeplechase, race walk, jumps (high jump, pole vault, long jump, triple jump) and throwing events (shot put, discus, hammer, and javelin), as well as team relays.

The USA National Masters Outdoor Track and Field Championship has included many prominent feats within the sport of masters track and field. At the 1968 meet, James Gorrell ran one of the fastest miles ever run by an athlete over age 40. The 1969 meet included 535 participants.  At the 1970 meet, Richard Stolpe broke the 220 yard masters record in 23.3, Jack Razzetto the high jump record, and Sandy Patterson the hammer throw record. More recently, distance runner Nolan Shaheed and sprinter Irene Obera have been multi-time masters national champions.

In August 1988 a major milestone was achieved when Philipa Raschker was the first female to pole vault at a major USA track and field championship for any age category. She vaulted 2.45 (8'-0 1/2") at age 40.

The 1988 meet added a special event the “Legends Miles” (M40) that included Ron Bell (Britain), Byron Dyce (Jamaican Olympian), Harry Nolan, John Dixon (New Zealand), Ken Sparks, Al Swenson, Web Loudat, Steve Ferraz, and Ron Jensen. Bell setting a new M40 World Record while winning in 4:12.58.

Frank Struna has had much success at the competition, winning eight national championships (six triple jump and two long jump), and setting a then current M55 indoor triple jump record.

The 2009 meet included several masters records by Leland McPhie (M95), Karen Steen (W45), Sabre Harvey (W60), Becky Sisley (W70) and Florence Meiler (W70).

At the July 2010 meet Ralph Maxwell was the first American age 90 plus to complete the sprint hurdle race. Ralph was rewarded with a gold medal and a masters M90 world record in a time of 21.47.

The 2014 meet included three separate M90 plus masters relay records. Each record included a foursome all age 90 and older. Champion Goldy Sr (97), Orville Rogers (96), Roy Englert (92), Charles Ross (91), and Charles Boyle (91) shared the workload, medals, and records.

USATF offered funds to top ranked American masters athletes to support travel to the competition in 2019.

A full history of past results of the competition is held by Mastershistory.org, while a full list of organizer bids for the event is held at the USATF website.

Participants

Olympians
Numerous Olympians have competed at the USA Masters Outdoor Championships. In 1968 Bruce MacDonald won two gold medals. Johnny Kelley, winner at the Boston Marathon, was also the winner of the M50+ division Marathon race, Bud Held won the javelin in 218’-2”, and Fortune Gordien won in his discus throw category. Gordien and George Rhoden (a Jamaican Olympian) won gold at the 1969 meet. Bud Held broke the masters world record in the javelin with 229’-3” throw at the 1970 meet. The July 1970 meet also included Arthur Barnard, Boo Morcom, Bob Richards, and Steve Seymour as competitors.

Payton Jordan (1964 and 1968 Olympic Coach) won 100 and 200 meters at the 1989 meet.

Jim Burnett competed at the 1980 Masters Outdoor Championship was an alternate leg on the 1968 Olympics relay team.

The 1994 Outdoor meet included Tom Gage, Phil Mulkey, Deby LaPlante Sweezey, and Fred Sowerby (an Antigua and Barbuda Olympian).

1996, Kate Schmidt (age 42) won the javelin at the Masters National Outdoor Track and Field Championship, Spokane, WA.

Jo Ann Terry Grissom won the shot put at the 2003 meet.

The 2009 Meet included Ed Burke, Dick Cochran, Trish Porter, and Karl Smith (Jamaica Olympian).

Ed Burke, Kip Janvrin, Sunder Nix, Jason Rouser and Chris Williams (Jamaican Olympian) competed at the 2013 meet.

Chaunté Lowe won the high jump at the July 2015 USA Masters Outdoor Track and Field Championship.

Walter Dix won the 100 meter dash at the 2017 meet in 10.28. Michelle Rohl and Jim Barrineau competed at the 2019 Ames, Iowa meet.

Others

"The Freeze" of the Atlanta Braves (Durann Dunn) competed at the 2022 Meet.

Competitors Charles Allie and Rita Hanscom received the male and female masters international athlete of the year awards from the IAAF in 2013 and 2009, respectively.

Several former National Football League (NFL) football players have competed at this meet. NFL pro bowler Billy "White Shoes" Johnson and star sprinter, ran at the 2004 meet. Others include Todd Christensen (2006), Henry Ellard (2014–2016), Willie Gault (2003), Fred Jackson (2019), and James Lofton (2001).

Several notable individuals from politics have been involved with the Masters National Outdoor Track and Field Championship.
Senator and ex-Stanford trackman Alan Cranston competed in the 100 yard dash at the 1969 meet. Massachusetts RRCA State Representative Stephen Viegas competed at the 2012 meet. In September 1970, Ken Carnine, winner of the 1970 discus throw and javelin throw events, was given the honor to present former President Richard Nixon a special medal for the President's support of Masters Track and Field competition.

Chancellor of the University of California, Irvine, Daniel Aldrich, competed in several National Championships, with him remarking in the Los Angeles Times "My whole attitude about life and my general personal and physical characteristics are affected by my sports activities...but I’m certainly the best discus-throwing administrator in the country".  A predecessor in his former position as Chancellor of University of California, Santa Barbara, Vernon Cheadle held several age records in the shot put.

Judge John Dobroth won the high jump at the 2010 meet.

Centenarians that have competed at this meet include Orville Rogers (age 100 in 2018) and Julia "Hurricane" Hawkins (age 101 in 2017).

Masters world champion and world record holder, Nolan Shaheed is a world class trumpet player. Shaheed has played with Count Basie, Stevie Wonder, and Aretha Franklin. For Shaheed the running and music has benefited each other.

Media coverage
The Championships are webcast on usatf.tv, with several cameras around the venue and an announcer providing athlete introductions and live commentary.

The competition has often received national coverage focused on the oldest participants. 2018 medal winner, Orville Rogers (age 100) and his family were interviewed by The Washington Post, Fox News, ESPN, and CBS during the 2018 season. The Washington Post also reported on the 2017 event, where at age 101 Julia “Hurricane” Hawkins became the oldest female to compete at the Masters National Outdoor Championship, setting a masters W100 meet record.

Organizers of open class events have responded positively to the event, such as in 2009 Bob Weiner (USATF Masters Media Chair) stating "the event ran smoothly [and] was a spectacularly executed meet".

The Honolulu Advertiser provided coverage of Harold Chapson's performance, who having had polio at age 5 became the 1976 Masters National Champion.

Ames Tribune included an action picture of hurdlers Rita Hanscom, Kay Glynn (local resident), and Jo Phelps at the 2019 Championship.

Runner Space reported that the 2021 Championship included 27 Masters American Records and five Masters World Records.

Editions

Source for Meet Dates and Locations confirmed: Track & Field History

Gallery

2022

See also
USA Masters Track and Field Hall of Fame
List of masters athletes
USATF Masters Indoor Championships

References

Further reading
Book: Masters Track and Field: A History by Leonard T Olson
Age is no barrier. 2011. Bryan Thomas. ISBN 978-0-9803191-1-8

External links
USATF Masters website
World Masters Athletics (WMA)
Masters Championship results
Masters Newsletters, Magazines and Bulletins
USMITT Newsletter
List of USA Masters Track and Field Records

United States athletics (track and field) championships
Masters athletics (track and field)
Recurring sporting events established in 1968
1968 establishments in California
National athletics competitions
Track and field competitions in the United States